Joice Riana Sutedja (born 5 June 1974) is an Indonesian former professional tennis player.

Tennis career
Sutedja, a native of Cirebon, won three medals for Indonesia at the 1991 Southeast Asian Games. She reached a career high singles ranking of 220 while competing on the professional tour and won one ITF title. Her best WTA Tour performance was a second round appearance at the 1993 Asian Open in Osaka. She represented her country in two Federation Cup rubbers in 1993 and won both, the first in doubles against the Philippines and the other in the opening singles rubbers of a playoff tie against Singapore, which helped Indonesia earn promotion to the World Group.

Personal life
Sutedja has two daughters from her marriage to Ali Santoso.

ITF finals

Singles: 1 (1–0)

References

External links
 
 
 

1974 births
Living people
Indonesian female tennis players
Southeast Asian Games medalists in tennis
Southeast Asian Games gold medalists for Indonesia
Southeast Asian Games silver medalists for Indonesia
Competitors at the 1991 Southeast Asian Games
People from Cirebon
20th-century Indonesian women